The 1993–94 Southern Football League season was the 91st in the history of the league, an English football competition.

Farnborough Town won the Premier Division and earned promotion to the Football Conference. Moor Green, Waterlooville, Bashley and Nuneaton Borough were relegated to the Midland and Southern Divisions, whilst Rushden & Diamonds, Gravesend & Northfleet, VS Rugby and Sudbury Town were promoted to the Premier Division, the former two as champions.

Despite neither finishing bottom of the table, both Dunstable and Canterbury City dropped into level eight leagues.

Premier Division
The Premier Division consisted of 22 clubs, including 18 clubs from the previous season and four new clubs:
Two clubs promoted from the Midland Division:
Gresley Rovers
Nuneaton Borough

Plus:
Farnborough Town, relegated from the Football Conference
Sittingbourne, promoted from the Southern Division

League table

Midland Division
The Midland Division consisted of 22 clubs, including 19 clubs from the previous season and three new clubs:
Armitage 90, promoted from the Midland Football Combination
Clevedon Town, promoted from the Western League
VS Rugby, relegated from the Premier Division

League table

Southern Division
The Southern Division consisted of 22 clubs, including 20 clubs from the previous season and two new clubs:
Tonbridge, promoted from the Kent League
Weymouth, relegated from the Premier Division

At the end of the previous season Salisbury changed name to Salisbury City, and Fisher Athletic changed name to Fisher.

At the end of the season Tonbridge changed name to Tonbridge Angels.

League table

See also
Southern Football League
1993–94 Isthmian League
1993–94 Northern Premier League

References

Southern Football League seasons
6